The third edition of the Futsal Confederations Cup, which was called the Futsal Continental Cup for this tournament, was held in Kuwait from October 23 to October 28, 2014.

The tournament was organized by the federations of national participants, in collaboration with Sheikh Talal Al Mohammad Al Sabah, but was not approved by FIFA. Eight teams took part: Egypt, Argentina, Italy, Kuwait (included in Group A), Brazil, Czech Republic, Japan and Guatemala (included in Group B).

Teams

Group stage

Group A

Group B

Final stage

Semifinals

Third Place

Final

Honors

References

External links 
 Official Site

International futsal competitions hosted by Kuwait
2014 in futsal
Futsal Confederations Cup